Moumoon (stylized as moumoon) is a Japanese pop duo comprising YUKA (vocals) and Kousuke Masaki (guitar). The band's name is a portmanteau of the French word "mou" (soft) and the English "moon". 
 
The duo met at a summer rock festival in 2004; after swapping demo tapes, the pair decided to work together professionally. The band self-produced and arrange the vast majority of their songs, with Masaki composing the music while YUKA writes the lyrics.　

Both band members were brought up on classical music, with Masaki playing piano and YUKA a keen violinist. Their present musical style covers various types of music such as pop, alternative rock, electronica, folk and indie rock. 
 
A popular band in their native Japan and elsewhere, many of their songs have received massive amounts of radio airplay, and been used in TV commercials and television soundtracks. They tour regularly (including a sequence of "Fullmoon Live" shows every full moon night), and are best known for their 2010 top-ten single, "Sunshine Girl".

Biography

2004–2006: Formation and indies
Yuka and Masaki met in summer 2004, but it was not until 2005 that they formed Moumoon. In October 2005, the duo held their first live performance at the Omotesando FAB. In 2006, they signed with the indie label Gate Records and released their debut single "Flowers/Pride". The single charted on the Oricon single charts at number 106. Soon after, Moumoon released their debut mini-album, Flowers (September 2006), which debuted at number 63 on the Oricon album charts.

Major debut
On May 12, 2010, they released their eighth single, "Sunshine Girl", which entered the Oricon single charts at number 12, a first for the group. The following week the single rose to number 10, becoming their first Top 10 single. The duo released their fourth mini-album, titled Spark, on July 7, 2010.

In 2015, moumoon performed at the SXSW music festival in Austin, Texas, as part of the Japan Nite showcase.

2021–present: Back to indies
On November 30, 2020, it was announced that their contract with Avex Trax had expired and the duo decided to not renew it, and they will be working independently again after 13 years of contract with Avex.

On March 27, 2022, it was announced via the group's official Instagram account that Masaki and Yuka had married.

Discography

Studio albums

Concept albums

Mini-albums

Singles

Special singles

Digital singles

References

External links
Official website (indies) 
Official website (under Avex Trax) 

Japanese musical duos
Japanese pop music groups
Musical groups established in 2005
Avex Group artists
Female-fronted musical groups
Male–female musical duos
Musical groups from Tokyo